Oreaster is a genus of sea stars in the family Oreasteridae.

Selected species
Species include:
Oreaster clavatus Müller & Troschel, 1842
Oreaster reticulatus (Linnaeus, 1758)

References

Oreasteridae